Vukovje is a settlement in the Municipality of Pesnica in northeastern Slovenia. It lies north and east of the Pernica Reservoir in the Slovene Hills. The area is part of the traditional region of Styria. The municipality is now included in the Drava Statistical Region.

Two small roadside chapel-shrines in the settlement date to the early 20th century.

References

External links
Vukovje on Geopedia

Populated places in the Municipality of Pesnica